Asian studies is the term used usually in North America and Australia for what in Europe is known as Oriental studies. The field is concerned with the  Asian people, their cultures, languages, history and politics. Within the Asian sphere, Asian studies combines aspects of sociology, history, cultural anthropology and many other disciplines to study political, cultural and economic phenomena in Asian traditional and contemporary societies. Asian studies form a field of post-graduate study in many universities.

It is a branch of area studies, and many Western universities combine Asian and African studies in a single faculty or institute, like SOAS in London.  It is often combined with Islamic studies in a similar way.  The history of the discipline in the West is covered under Oriental studies.

Branches
 South Asian studies (Indology)
 Bengal studies
 Dravidian studies
 Tamilology
 Pakistan studies
 Sindhology
 Southeast Asian studies
 Filipinology (Philippine studies)
 Thai studies
 Vietnamese studies
 Myanmar studies
 Indonesian studies
 East Asian studies
 Sinology (Chinese studies)
 Taiwan studies
 Japanese studies
 Ainu studies
 Okinawan studies
 Ryukyuan studies
 Jurchen studies
 Khitan studies
 Korean studies
 Manchurology
 Mongolian studies
 Tangutology
 Tibetology (Tibetan studies)
 Uyghur studies
 Western Asian studies
 Jewish studies
 Iranian studies
 Central Asian studies
 Turkology
 Semitic studies
 Assyriology
 Hebraic studies
 Jewish studies (often overlapping with Middle Eastern studies)
 Islamic studies (often overlapping with Middle Eastern and Central Asian studies)

See also
 Asian American studies
East Asian Studies
 Black and Asian Studies Association
 Cultural studies
 Egyptology
 European studies
 International Journal of Asian Studies
Journal of Asian Studies
 Bachelor of Asian Studies

External links 
 International Institute for Asian Studies
 Graduate Programs in Asian
 ANU College of Asia & the Pacific
 Contemporary Asian Studies- University of Amsterdam
 Centre for East and South-East Asian Studies - Lund University
 
 

 
Area studies